Dambar Shumsher Rana (also known as Sano Maila; 1858–1922) was a Nepalese general.

Biography 
Rana was born in 1858 to Dhir Shamsher Rana. He was not in the rolls of succession as he was born out of wedlock.

He participated in the 1885 Nepal coup d'état where Dambar Shumsher, Khadga Shumsher, and Rana Shumsher Jung Bahadur Rana assassinated then prime minister Ranodip Singh Kunwar. This led to his elder brother Bir Shumsher Jung Bahadur Rana becoming the Prime Minister of Nepal.  Subsequently, Bir Shumsher appointed Rana as an aide-de-camp. 

Dambar Shumsher Rana had staged pageants and plays for the nobles from the Rana dynasty. In 1893, he founded the Royal Imperial Opera House in Narayanhiti Palace, Kathmandu. 

Rana's grandson Balkrishna Sama, is recognised as one of the greatest dramatists in Nepal. He died in 1922. 

Dambar Shumsher Rana is recognised as the first photographer from Nepal.

References 

1858 births
1922 deaths
19th-century Nepalese nobility
20th-century Nepalese nobility
Nepalese generals
Nepalese photographers
Nepalese dramatists and playwrights
Rana dynasty